The Harry Potter video games are a series of video games based on the Harry Potter franchise originally created by J.K. Rowling. Many of the Harry Potter-inspired video games are tie-ins to the novels and films of the same name. The main series features a video game for every novel, as well as two for the finale. There are multiple distinct versions for individual games.

After the success of the initial games, Warner Bros. Games created the label Portkey Games and expanded the series to include a pair of Lego video games. The games have sold over 50 million units and grossed over $1.5 billion in video game sales and an additional $1 billion in mobile game sales; the main series received mixed reviews from critics, while the Lego games were both critically and commercially successful. Hogwarts Legacy, the latest release, has made $850 million in its first two weeks post-launch.

Development
Despite the games having a wide variety of developers, Electronic Arts developed all games from Harry Potter and the Goblet of Fire until Harry Potter and the Deathly Hallows – Part 2.

Film adaptations

Generally, the video game adaptations of the Harry Potter series were designed to be released to coincide with the release schedule of the film series. The first game in the series, Harry Potter and the Philosopher's Stone (known as "Harry Potter and the Sorcerer's Stone", for the North American release) was developed by five different teams, each creating different versions for different consoles. The games were developed by Argonaut Games (PlayStation), Aspyr (Mac OS), Griptonite Games (Game Boy Color and Game Boy Advance), and KnowWonder (personal computer). Two years later, Warthog Games released versions for sixth generation consoles (GameCube, PlayStation 2, and Xbox). The version was released after the Harry Potter and the Chamber of Secrets, and used many of the same assets. The game featured puzzles aimed at "eight- to fourteen-year-olds" and aimed to capture the mood of the novel of the same name.

During the release of Harry Potter and the Chamber of Secrets in 2002, developer Eurocom was brought on board to create the sixth generation console releases (GameCube, PlayStation 2 and Xbox) as well as the Game Boy Advance and the Game Boy Color release. This version included new assets specifically for the Chamber of Secrets and free-roam flying on a broomstick on the PlayStation 2 release, which was not possible on any other release. This version removed many of the puzzle sections found in the first game and replaced them with action sections and boss fights.  The PC version, however, used many of the same assets as those in Philosopher's Stone, and retained a more puzzle-oriented gameplay style.

The release of Harry Potter and the Prisoner of Azkaban (2004) switched genre to a role-playing video game (RPG). GameSpot likened the game to Chrono Trigger and Pokémon. The third instalment featured separate games for the PC version and a console release (which was this time developed by EA UK). Both of these versions made Harry, Hermione and Ron playable characters. In the PC release, Buckbeak and Hedwig were made playable as well.

In 2005, World of Harry Potter was released for PC, containing all of the first three novel games, and the Quiddich World Cup game. Following Prisoner of Azkaban, EA, specifically EA UK (which was later renamed as EA Bright Light), took charge of creating all versions of the game. The PC and Mac releases were developed as ports of the console release. In Harry Potter and the Goblet of Fire (2005), the style from previous titles was reduced to a more linear, level based system, as the character followed certain scenes from the film. Multiplayer components were factored into the game's release: up to three players from the same console. This was also the first game in the series to be released on Nintendo DS.

During the development of Harry Potter and the Order of the Phoenix (2007), the development team had more interaction with author J.K. Rowling when attempting to create playable card games for the series. The rules that were created were later revealed to be the official rules in canon. This release was the first in the series to include motion capture from actors in the film series, including Rupert Grint and Evanna Lynch. The release removed the multiplayer component of the previous two games; Fred and George Weasley were still playable, but only in certain locations. The game made a return to the free-roaming style of earlier games.

In 2009, Harry Potter and the Half-Blood Prince was released after originally being planned for 2008. It was pushed back six months to be released with the film of the same name. Like with the previous game, the multiplayer component was removed; Ron and Ginny Weasley were still playable, but only in certain locations. The final two games in the main series, Harry Potter and the Deathly Hallows – Part 1 (2010) and Part 2 (2011), take place away from Hogwarts, and features locations such as The Ministry of Magic. These games use a stealth and combat mechanic similar to those found in modern first person shooters. Jonathan Bunney, head of Production at EA Bright Light, stated that the final two instalments would be "darker and more action-oriented game(s)."

Other

The first retail release of a Harry Potter game outside of the film adaptations was for the Lego Creator, released in 2001 as Lego Creator: Harry Potter and the sequel, Lego Creator: Harry Potter and the Chamber of Secrets, released in 2002. Following the release of Chamber of Secrets, EA Games engaged game developer Magic Pockets, who created the Game Boy Advanced version, to produce a video game based on Quidditch.

Due to the release schedule of the film Harry Potter and the Prisoner of Azkaban, there was no main series release in 2003. Instead, Harry Potter: Quidditch World Cup was released in its place. Previous games had featured Quidditch but only focused on Potter as the seeker; Quidditch World Cup put players in control of the team's chasers and the rest of the team's players via mini-games. The game featured both matches played at Hogwarts, and matches played internationally.

In 2010, following a release of a special Potter-themed Lego set, Lego Harry Potter, Traveller's Tales announced that a Lego Harry Potter video game would be released, similar to releases for Lego Indiana Jones: The Original Adventures and Lego Star Wars: The Complete Saga. The series was split into two: Lego Harry Potter: Years 1–4 was released in 2010 followed by Lego Harry Potter: Years 5–7 in 2011.

In 2012 and 2013, two augmented reality games were created, titled Book of Spells and Book of Potions respectively. These were both released for PlayStation 3,  and used the PlayStation Move controller, as well as the Wonderbook accessory for the PlayStation Eye. The Wonderbook accessory was brought out in conjuncture with Book of Spells, allowing players to see an augmented reality version of real life books.

In 2017, two new themed character packs for a Toys-to-life console video game Lego Dimensions were released. One contained Lego figurines of Harry, Voldemort, mini Ford Anglia and mini Hogwarts Express, while the other one contained figurines of Hermione and Buckbeak. At the same time, Portkey Games partnered with Jam City to release Harry Potter: Hogwarts Mystery in March 2018 for iOS and Android. The game was a spin off from the Harry Potter universe by setting the game before the book series, but still at Hogwarts. The game featured similar components to those of other freemium games, such as wait timers, and microtransactions.

Following the release of Pokémon Go, in 2019 Niantic announced Harry Potter: Wizards Unite, a similar augmented reality game. The game allowed players to see the game world through a smartphone.

In 2020, Harry Potter: Puzzles & Spells by Zynga Inc. was released on App Store, Google Play, Amazon Kindle, and Facebook Gaming in 14 languages.

Hogwarts Legacy, an open-world, action role-playing video game and a prequel to the Harry Potter books, was released on February 10, 2023.

Gameplay
In the novel video games, gameplay is featured around puzzle solving with some action-oriented scenes. Releases in the series generally followed the plot of the associated novel. The protagonist learns spells or other techniques from classes within Hogwarts school, which are often used to solve the puzzles at hand. While some are similar to those used in other Harry Potter media (such as "Wingardium Leviosa", used for levitating objects), other spells are unique to the video games (such as "Flipendo", described as the "knockback jinx", an attacking spell, used to push objects, or "Spongify", to make an object turn into a bounce pad).

Earlier games in the series contained "secrets" which were a countable list of hidden extras. The games contained "beans", based on "Bertie Botts every flavour beans", used as currency, and Famous Witch or Wizard cards, used as collectables. However, in later games (specifically the final two entries), entries employ first person shooter and stealth sections.

Releases

List of console and PC games

List of mobile games

List of browser and flash games

Reception

Sales

Critical response

Film adaptations

The Harry Potter video game series received mixed reviews from critics. Nintendo consoles (specifically the Wii) scored higher marks than other console releases. According to media review site Metacritic, the series received its best response for the Chamber of Secrets game. Despite the game being created differently for different systems, the game was rated higher consoles across the board against every other entry in the series.

 
The series was judged on its representation of the novel and film series. Detroit Free Press gave the Goblet of Fire GameCube version four out of four stars and said, "this is a masterful video game because it can be enjoyed on many levels. Younger players can simply explore this graphically rich Harry Potter world and succeed. Older players will enjoy manipulating the magic by choosing spells and skills and casting magic together with friends." However, The Sydney Morning Herald gave the game three out of five stars and stated that the series highlight "is a brief but thrilling broomstick chase against a fire-breathing dragon. An underwater interlude is less successful, although it provides variety." Frank Provo of GameSpot was very positive about the Prisoner of Azkaban GBA game's recreation of the novel; saying "The main thing to keep in mind is that Prisoner of Azkaban on the GBA offers a fun way for Harry Potter fans to step into the shoes of their favorite wizard-in-training and experience firsthand everything that happened in the third instalment of the series." Gerald Villoria of GameSpot praised the developers efforts, for the PlayStation version, in re-creating the Hogwarts castle and different looking characters, but said the despite the graphics being like "extremely jagged polygons."

Later entries in the series received increasingly lower scores on Metacritic, as critics rated Deathly Hallows – Part 1 being the poorest reviewed. The Official Xbox Magazine stated the game had "so much wrong with [it] that we don't have space to list it all" and Kristine Steimer from IGN calling that game not "worthy of the Harry Potter branding" before giving the gameplay for the game 2 out of 10, stating "Between the camera breaking frequently, boring shoot-out sequences and uninspired stealth missions, the game gets worse and worse as you play."

Other games

Other games based around Harry Potter have been generally praised better than the novel adaptions, especially the Lego Harry Potter games. Lego Harry Potter: Years 1-4 specifically scored well: Metacritic scored the game at 79%, for its PC, PlayStation 3 and Xbox release. Greg Miller of IGN praised the game for its "gorgeous environments, clever use of the famed spells, legitimate humor and adorable references" and called it a "love letter to fans of the Boy Who Lived." The Official Nintendo Magazine gave the Wii and DS version 80%, saying that it was "one of the best Harry Potter games ever", however it lacked originality compared to previous Lego video games.

Besides the Lego Harry Potter titles, two titles were released for the PlayStation 3, using augmented reality. Book of Potions and Book of Spells both built for the Wonderbook, received mixed reviews from critics. They criticized the game's short length, but commended use of the augmented reality within the games. Alex Simmons of IGN commented that Book of Spells was "shallow and rarely compelling", but called the technology behind it "fantastic". Harry Potter: Hogwarts Mystery, also released in 2018,  received media backlash for its use of microtransactions, despite the game being free to play. David Jagnaeux from IGN Africa reviewed the game, but called it "awful", and the "gratuitous" microtransactions "actively prevented" him from enjoying the game.

Awards
In 2002, Harry Potter and the Philosopher's Stone was nominated for three D.I.C.E. Awards in the "Console Family", "Original Musical Composition" and "PC Family" categories. Lego Harry Potter: Years 1–4 won the Kotaku "best adapted game" award in 2010, with Brian Crecente proclaiming it to be the "Best Lego Game to Date." The game was nominated for two awards in the 7th British Academy Games Awards, in the "family" and "handheld" sections. In addition, it was nominated for "Best Adapted Video Game" for the Spike Video Game Awards in 2010. The musical score of Harry Potter and the Chamber of Secrets by Jeremy Soule received a BAFTA Award for Original Music in 2004.

Harry Potter and the Half-Blood Prince received a BAFTA nomination in 2010 for James Hannigan's music score, and won an International Film Music Critics Association (IFMCA) Award for best video game score in 2009. Book of Spells received a nomination for "game innovation" at the BAFTA Awards in 2013. As of 2014, the Harry Potter video game series was stated to have sold $1.5 billion in sales.

Notes

References

External links
 

 
Video game franchises
Warner Bros. Games franchises
Video games set in the United Kingdom
Lists of video games by franchise
Video game franchises introduced in 2001
Electronic Arts games